Ostrowy-Cukrownia  is a settlement in the administrative district of Gmina Nowe Ostrowy, within Kutno County, Łódź Voivodeship, in central Poland.

The settlement has a population of 40.

References

Ostrowy-Cukrownia